Kamada (written:  lit. "sickle ricefield") is a Japanese surname. Notable people with the surname include:

, Japanese footballer
, Japanese fencer
, Japanese sport wrestler
, Imperial Japanese Navy admiral
, Japanese motorcycle racer
, Japanese footballer
, Japanese photographer

See also
 Kamata (disambiguation)

Japanese-language surnames